The Texas Tech Lady Raiders basketball team, representing Texas Tech University, has had 9 players drafted into the Women's National Basketball Association (WNBA) since the league began holding drafts in 1997. Sheryl Swoopes was Texas Tech's first player drafted in the WNBA, selected in the 1997 Initial Player Allocation. The Charlotte Sting had drafted three Lady Raiders, more than any other WNBA franchise: Michi Atkins, in the WNBA Elite Draft, and Angie Braziel and Jia Perkins during the college draft.

Key

Drafts

Initial player allocation

Elite Draft

College draft

Notes

References
General

Specific

Texas Tech Lady Raiders basketball
Texas Tech
Lady Raiders
Texas Tech Lady Raiders WNBA Draft